Ranatra fusca is a water stick-insect in the family Nepidae, native to North America. It is known by the common name brown water scorpion.

References

External links
Photo on flickr

Insects described in 1820
Nepidae